Wallace McCutcheon may refer to:

 Wallace McCutcheon Sr. (1858 or 1862–1918), pioneer cinematographer and director in the early American motion picture industry
 Malcolm Wallace McCutcheon (1906–1969), Canadian lawyer, actuary and politician (unrelated to Wallace McCutcheon, Sr.)